Allium scorzonerifolium is a yellow-flowered species of wild onion native to Spain, Portugal, and Morocco.

References

External links

scorzonerifolium
Onions